The Tejo Power Station, operating from 1908 to 1975, is a former coal-fired power station in the Belém district of Lisbon, Portugal.

It now houses the Museu da Electricidade (Electricity Museum) complex.

Introduction
After continuous transformations and expansions, the Tejo Power Station remains largely true to its original design. It represents a large manufacturing complex from the first half of the 20th century, readapted for museological purposes. Its brick outer cladding makes the Tejo power station visually distinct, while the interior is supported by an iron structure.

Former Tejo Power Station 

Before the current industrial structure, there was a small "electricity factory" on the site, the original Tejo Power Station, commonly called the Junqueira Power Station, given its proximity to the street with the same name. Nothing remains of that building, built in 1909 and based on the project by engineer Lucien Neu, with architectural execution carried out by Charles Vieillard and Fernand Touzet. It had a modernist aesthetic and ornamentation on its north and south facades. On the building's western side, three industrial naves housed the boilers. The defining features of this old power plant were the slender chimneys, one in brick and one in iron, in an inverted conical stem shape.

The north and south facades of the central nave, where the generators were located, were decorated similarly to other iron architecture structures, such as train stations and markets, with modernist influences recently seen in Portugal. These were divided into three sections separated by pilasters, small cogged friezes that ran horizontally along them and, crowning the structure, a large broken pediment. The side sections displayed two bays: the smaller topped with a lintel, and the larger finished with a low arch. The central section, larger than the sides, stood out due to its large bay spanning the entire facade from the base to the top, entering the pediment and forcing it up. Engraved in tile on the semi-circular arch's alfiz was the inscription: 1909 / Cªs Reunidas de Gaz e Electricidade / Estação Eléctrica Tejo Power Station (“United Gas and Electric Companies / Tejo Electric Power Station”).

The industrial naves of the old sugar refinery located beside the power station and previously owned by the Companhia de Açúcar de Moçambique (Mozambique Sugar Company) date back to the end of the 19th century. These were purchased when the old Tejo Power Station began to be demolished.
It is a small plant with little ornamentation but a very characteristic shape consisting of two longitudinal naves with a mound-shaped roof – a kind of central tower that functioned as a silo – and four transversal naves on the western side, covered with a gable roof. All bays are protected by a brick frame and are finished with a low arch.

Current Tejo Power Plant

Low-Pressure Phase 

Construction on the Low-Pressure Building began in the middle of the 1910s, although several expansions were carried out until 1930. The building has early Modernist style architectural elements. It has an iron structure with the characteristic brick cladding, which would end up being used in the High-Pressure Building as well.

The old Boiler Room is made up of four industrial naves, three of them identical and the fourth on a larger scale, covered with gable roofs which inside create a single diaphanous space. On the eastern side, and placed across these, there are two more naves that follow the same modernist aesthetic, although the furthest nave, the substation's building, doesn't have a gable roof.

The relatively low facades stand out due to their large vertical windows finished with semi-circular arches. Above these, a kind of pediment with an accented trim and a lintel closes the space. Under all this, a flat base where the brick is hidden, decorated with low arch frames simulating openings (some of them really are bays), “supports” the rest of the entire facade.

The Machinery Room's facade deserves particular attention. Of all the buildings, this is the one that displays the most decorative motifs and the most modernist elements, as occurred with the original Tejo Power Station and most of the electric power stations at the time, (maybe due to the machinery room being the heart that generates the power produced in the plant), yet without clashing with the complex's aesthetic. At its base, there are some differences in comparison with the other facades. The wall is covered in carved stone, except for the lower layers which are in unfinished stone, and above the arched openings, a keystone.

At the brick level, there are also three large windows that finish in semi-circular arches, the middle window being a little larger than the others, and a continuous frame with a keystone at the top of the arches, which spans the entire facade to the building's sides. The top of the facade, also formed by a broken pediment, displays decorative frames made from brick, simulating Lombard bands. On the facade's extremities, pilasters that originate at the base rise to the pediment, reminiscent of two small towers on church facades.

The longitudinal facades display a harmonious composition divided into three areas separated by large pilasters. Each of these areas has three large vertical windows adorned with a continuous frame that spans the entire side. Above each of these windows there is a smaller square window, a kind of frieze that crowns the building's side.

High Pressure Phase 

In the High Pressure Building, the decorative motifs are different from those in the Low Pressure Building, where the classicist influences gain height and monumentality. Nonetheless, the same brick cladding aesthetic is repeated. In the building's interior, similar to what is seen in the Low Pressure Boiler Room, the ceiling separating the Ash Room from the Boiler Room is covered in semi-circular vaults, with the only difference between the two being that in the Low Pressure Building these are in tile and in the High Pressure Building they are in precast concrete.

The building was built in the 1940s with classical influences from renaissance palaces, a faithful reflection of that period as well as of the Fascist system that ruled Portugal then.
Its structure is a true engineering masterpiece; a model of iron architecture unequalled in Lisbon, which sustains not only the entire brick cladding, but also the boilers, the chimneys and the water reservoir located at the top of the building.
Aesthetically, the facade follows the models of a renaissance palace, divided into base, pilasters and entablature. The main body displays large windows that end in semi-circular arches with a keystone, and outlined with a frame that runs the entire length of the facade. Between the windows there are large pilasters that span the entire facade, from the bottom of the base to the top of the entablature.

The upper entablature has two independent friezes. The lower is decorated with blind arcades, marked by frames. The upper entablature displays the same organisation, but with the spaces outlined by frames formed by windows.
A small tower stands out in the section closer to the Low Pressure Building and, above everything else in the complex, the High Pressure boilers’ four chimneys, and at their bases, the entire smoke extraction and air recovery system.

Thus, the Tejo Power Station stands out from all the surrounding buildings, not only due to its monumentality and size, but also because of its aesthetic brick adornment, sometimes making it hard to believe that it was once an electricity factory.

See also

Museu da Electricidade

External links 
  Patrimonial Card/IGESPAR

Architectural Ensemble
Belém (Lisbon)
Buildings and structures in Lisbon
Brick buildings and structures
Neoclassical architecture in Portugal
20th century in Lisbon